Danais may refer to

Danais (epic), a Greek epic
Danais (hundred), a historic subdivision of Hertfordshire, England
Danais (plant), a genus of Rubiaceae
Natacha Danais (1977–1990), a victim of serial killer Michel Fourniret